The State Register of Heritage Places is maintained by the Heritage Council of Western Australia. , 210 places are heritage-listed in the Shire of Bruce Rock, of which four are on the State Register of Heritage Places.

List
The Western Australian State Register of Heritage Places, lists the following four state registered places within the Shire of Bruce Rock:

References

Bruce
Bruce
Shire of Bruce Rock